Olancho is the largest of all the 18 departments into which Honduras is divided. The department covers a total surface area of 24,057 km² and has an estimated 2015 population of 537,306 inhabitants.

The departmental capital is Juticalpa, which is also the see of the Roman Catholic Diocese of Juticalpa, which covers the department.

Terrain

Rugged mountains rise in the western and northern portions of the department, notably the Sierra de Agalta, the Montaña de Tembladeros, and the Montaña de Botaderos. Vast pine and hardwood forests cover these mountains.

Central Olancho has rolling plains, watered by the Guayape River and its affluents. These plains, sometimes called pampas due to their similarity to the vast Argentinian plains, are famous for their large cattle herds and extensive farming. The main cities, capital Juticalpa and Catacamas, are located there.

The eastern part of the department is covered with rainforests, though the influx of impoverished, farmers and intense timber extraction have increased deforestation rates in the area. A portion of the Rio Platano Biosphere Reserve, a tropical rainforest with diverse wildlife and declared a World Heritage site by UNESCO, straddles the border of Olancho and the neighboring departments of Gracias a Dios and Colón.

The Guayape River is famous for its placer gold with concessions where today the mining company Eurocantera (Goldlake Group) exploits ethical gold. First exploited by the Spaniards during the colonial period, these gold deposits are still productive. Local men and women may be seen panning for gold in riverbanks during the dry season. Extensive gold dredging is also underway during the dry season in much of the river, including deep into the mountainous regions of the Rio Patuca (into which the Guayape feeds).

History

Background 
The Cave of Talgua, also known as "The Cave of the Glowing Skulls," is located near Catacamas. It was used as a burial site by the native peoples, and over time, the bones left there were covered by the calcite dripping from the ceiling, giving them an eerie, sparkling appearance. Radiocarbon testing indicated that the burials were made around 900 B.C., well before the rise of the Mayans and other civilizations. The ossuary chamber was discovered in 1994 by a Peace Corps volunteer named Timothy Berg, along with two Catacamas locals named Desiderio Reyes and Jorge Yáñez, and research is still being conducted in the area. In the 18th and 19th century, Olancho resisted government authority from Tegucigalpa, resulting in armed conflicts.

Olancho War 
On December 7, 1864, the arrest of a deputy named Rosales caused a rebellion against the highest authorities of the department and the central government. Led by Colonels Barahona, Zavala, and Antúnez, more than a thousand rebels marched towards Tegucigalpa in 1865. Faced with this situation, the president of the republic, General José María Medina, organized and led a military expedition to counter the rebels. At the end of the confrontation, Medina and his men imposed themselves on the rebels, capturing the leaders whom he shot, beheaded and buried. Several of the towns and villages of the Departments of Olancho Honduras were burned along with their inhabitants, and many of the rebels were killed in combat. Following this were many deportations and a mass exodus of Olanchanos to other parts of the country, reducing the population of Olancho. Manto lost his title of departmental head, which was transferred to Juticalpa.

Three years later, in 1868, a young man Serapio Romero, known as Cinchonero, arrived in Juticalpa with a group of men to challenge Nazario Garay. Romero and Serapio dueled with machetes, with Serapio Romero victorious. Then, defying the central government, Romero unearthed the heads of Colonels Barahona, Antúnez and Zavala, and he paid them a posthumous tribute. To this new rebellion, the government responded by sending a military contingent, who ended up defeating, capturing and beheading Romero. After these bloody events, Olancho became an almost depopulated department.

Modern day 

Old independent sentiments persist among Olanchanos, although the department's role as an agricultural producer has made it an integral part of the Honduran economy. The former president of Honduras, Porfirio Lobo, hails from the department, specifically from the city of Juticalpa. Also former president now congressman Manuel Zelaya Rosales is from the city of Catacamas, also from the department.

The Olancho Department remained as one of the most violent areas in Honduras until 2012.  In June 2012, after a Drug Enforcement Administration agent killed a suspect in Honduras, it was confirmed that the US government has been running covert operations in the Olancho area to combat drug trafficking. Many multinational corporations as well as charitable and religious organizations with personnel in Honduras actively discourage their members from visiting Olancho or suggest caution, as do the governments of the US, Canada, France, New Zealand and the UK, among others.

Municipalities

 Campamento
 Catacamas
 Concordia
 Dulce Nombre de Culmí
 El Rosario
 Esquipulas del Norte
 Gualaco
 Guarizama
 Guata
 Guayape
 Jano
 Juticalpa
 La Unión
 Mangulile
 Manto
 Patuca
 Salamá
 San Esteban
 San Francisco de Becerra
 San Francisco de la Paz
 Santa María del Real
 Silca
 Yocón

Demographics
At the time of the 2013 Honduras census, Olancho Department had a population of 520,761. Of these, 94.54% were Mestizo, 3.39% White, 1.23% Indigenous (0.71% Pech, 0.21% Lenca, 0.16% Nahua), 0.60% Black or Afro-Honduran and 0.24% others.

Tourism 

 Colonial church in the town of Catacamas.
 Talgua Caves.
 Part of the Río Plátano Biosphere Reserve, it is located in Olanchano territory.
 National parks of Patuca
 Agalta mountain range
 The wall
 The Boquerón

Notes

Popular culture 
Olancho was the subject of a 2017 feature-length documentary film of the same name. The documentary, which was directed and produced by American filmmakers Chris Valdes and Ted Griswold, focused on the lives of band members from Los Plebes de Olancho, a regional narco-corrido music band. The logline of the film is as follows:Manuel, a farmer from Olancho, Honduras, seeks fame by making music for the region’s drug cartels. When some of his song lyrics get him in trouble, Manuel must make the most difficult decision of his life: continue the quest for fame, or flee.Olancho premiered at the 2017 Big Sky Documentary Film Festival in Missoula, Montana. Over the course of the following two years, the film went on to screen at dozens of international film festivals, including at the Rotterdam Film Festival in the Netherlands and the Berlin Film Festival in Germany. The film earned the Special Jury Prize for Best Documentary Feature at the 2017 New Orleans Film Festival, Best Cinematography at the 2017 Tulsa American Film Festival, and Best Feature Documentary Film at the 2017 Nevada City Film Festival. Olancho is distributed by First Run Features and is now available streaming on Kanopy and for purchase on Amazon.

References

 
Departments of Honduras